Richard André Sarrazin (born January 22, 1946 in Saint-Gabriel-de-Brandon, Quebec), is a retired professional ice hockey player. He played in the National Hockey League (NHL) with the Philadelphia Flyers and also played in the World Hockey Association (WHA) with the New England Whalers and Chicago Cougars.

External links
 

1946 births
Baltimore Clippers players
Canadian ice hockey right wingers
Chicago Cougars players
Jacksonville Barons players
Living people
New England Whalers players
Ice hockey people from Quebec
Philadelphia Flyers players
Quebec Aces (AHL) players
Richmond Robins players
Syracuse Eagles players
People from Lanaudière